The Robotic Industries Association (RIA) was a United States trade group that serves the robotics industry. It was founded in 1974 and is headquartered in Ann Arbor, Michigan. The organization is involved in safety standards for robots, and sponsors robotics conferences. On April 14, 2021 the Robotic Industries Association, AIA-Advancing Vision + Imaging (AIA), the Motion Control and Motors Association (MCMA), and A3 Mexico merged into one group known as the Association for Advancing Automation (A3).

See also
 Japan Robot Association

References

External links
 Robotics.org organization web site
 

Robotics organizations
Organizations established in 1974